Auliapur is a village in Patuakhali Sadar Upazila of Barisal District of southern-central Bangladesh.

References

External links
 Satellite map at Maplandia.com
Populated places in Barisal District